Doublecortin domain-containing protein 2 is a protein that in humans is encoded by the DCDC2 gene.

Function 
This gene encodes a protein with two doublecortin peptide domains. This domain has been demonstrated to bind tubulin and enhance microtubule polymerization.

Clinical significance 
Mutations in this gene have been associated with reading disability (RD), also referred to as developmental dyslexia. But this is controverse since a recent study proposed that there is a "low likelihood of a direct deletion effect on reading skills."
Changes in the DCDC2 gene are frequently found among dyslexics. Altered alleles often occur among children with reading and writing difficulties. The gene appears to have a strong linkage with the processing of speech information when writing.

References

Further reading

Dyslexia research